The Diocese of Pittsburgh is a Latin Church ecclesiastical jurisdiction or diocese of the Catholic Church in Western Pennsylvania established on August 11, 1843. The cathedral church of the diocese is Saint Paul Cathedral. As of July 2021, the diocese had 194 active priests.

History

Founding
The first Mass celebrated within the boundaries of the Diocese was said on April 17, 1754, at Fort Duquesne by a Franciscan chaplain to the French troops there. A chapel was built and dedicated to the Virgin Mary under the title of "The Assumption of Our Lady of the Beautiful River", but fell into ruin after the French abandoned the area.

The Fifth Provincial Council of Baltimore, which was held in May 1843, recommended the erection of the Diocese of Pittsburgh and nominated Michael O'Connor, Vicar General of Western Pennsylvania and pastor of St. Paul's Church in Pittsburgh, as its first Bishop. The Diocese of Pittsburgh was erected from the Diocese of Philadelphia on August 11, 1843.

O'Connor was consecrated bishop in Rome on August 15, 1843, and on his return stopped in Ireland to recruit clergy for his new diocese, obtaining eight seminarians from Maynooth College and seven Sisters of Mercy from Dublin. He arrived in Pittsburgh in December 1843. In 1844, he founded a girls' academy and St. Paul's orphan asylum, a chapel for African Americans, the Pittsburgh Catholic and St. Michael's Seminary. To serve the German immigrants in his diocese, he welcomed the Benedictine monks who founded Saint Vincent Archabbey in Latrobe, the first Benedictine monastery in the United States. To further education he invited the Franciscan Brothers of Mountbellew in Ireland, who established the first community of religious brothers in the United States in Loretto.

Territory was reduced by the creation of the Diocese of Erie on July 29, 1853. Bishop O'Connor resigned in 1860 to enter the Society of Jesus. He was succeeded by Vincentian Father Michael Domenec, pastor of St. Vincent de Paul in Germantown. The panic of 1873 was a fiscal disaster for the Pittsburgh diocese. In 1876, Bishop Domenec became Bishop of the short-lived Diocese of Allegheny was created out of the Pittsburgh diocese on January 11, 1876. He was succeeded in Pittsburgh by Bishop John Tuigg, who, after Domenec's retirement in 1877, found himself apostolic administrator of Allegheny as well. Tuigg managed to extricate the diocese from its financial difficulties, but suffered a stroke and retired. The territory of Allegheny was reincorporated into Pittsburgh on July 1, 1889.

Tuigg was followed by his coadjutor Richard Phelan on December 7, 1889. People of many nationalities came in large numbers to find work in the mines and mills of Western Pennsylvania; Phelan saw to it that they were supplied with pastors who could speak their own languages.

Twentieth century
The Diocese of Altoona was formed from Pittsburgh on May 30, 1901. Phelan died December 20, 1904, and was succeeded by Bishop Regis Canevin.

Hugh Boyle was appointed the sixth bishop of Pittsburgh on June 16, 1921. During his 29-year tenure, he earned a reputation as one of the leading Catholic educators in the nation, and sponsored a comprehensive school-building program in the diocese, most notably asking the Brothers of the Christian Schools to establish Central Catholic High School. During World War II, Boyle served as chairman of the National Catholic Welfare Council's Committee for Polish Relief. Upon the death of Bishop Boyle, John Dearden succeeded him as the seventh bishop of Pittsburgh on December 22, 1950. The Diocese of Greensburg on March 10, 1951, was created out of Pittsburgh diocesan territory.

Bishop Dearden was appointed Archbishop of Detroit on December 18, 1958; John Joseph Wright became Bishop of Pittsburgh. Bishop Wright attended the Second Vatican Council (1962–65), during which he was a decisive force behind several of its documents. On April 23, 1969, Pope Paul VI appointed Wright as the Prefect of the Congregation for the Clergy, and thus the highest-ranking American in the Roman Curia.

After Bishop Wright was named to head the Congregation for the Clergy, Vincent Leonard was appointed the ninth bishop of Pittsburgh on June 1, 1969. During his tenure, he became one of the first bishops in the United States to make his diocesan financial reports public, and established a due-process system to allow Catholics to appeal any administrative decision they believed was a violation of canon law. Leonard resigned as Bishop of Pittsburgh on June 30, 1983, due to arthritis. Anthony Bevilacqua was named the tenth bishop of Pittsburgh on October 7, 1983. He succeeded Bishop Leonard and was installed as Bishop on December 12 of that year. He was a member of the 1987 world Synod of Bishops, on the role of the laity in the church and world. On December 8, 1987, Pope John Paul II appointed Bevilacqua Archbishop of Philadelphia.

Wuerl episcopate
Donald Wuerl was appointed the eleventh bishop of the Diocese of Pittsburgh on February 12, 1988. Despite the financial condition of the diocese, Bishop Wuerl decided to expand health services. Bishop Wuerl worked with hospitals and community groups to create a group home for people suffering from AIDS, when AIDS was little understood and almost always fatal. In 2003, Bishop Wuerl conducted a successful $2.5 million fundraising campaign to create the Catholic Charities Free Health Care Center. The clinic primarily serves the uninsured working poor.

Under Bishop Wuerl, the diocese had to reorganize itself in response to demographic changes, the decline of the steel industry, and the church's weak financial position. That process was officially completed in March 1994. Wuerl closed 73 church buildings, which included 37 churches, and reduced 331 parishes by 117 through merging while bishop of Pittsburgh; he was managing the remaining 214 parishes when he left in June 2006.

Twenty-first century
Pope Benedict XVI appointed David Zubik the twelfth Bishop of Pittsburgh on July 18, 2007.

In 2012, the Pittsburgh diocese was the first of 42 Catholic groups to file 12 federal lawsuits against the Obama administration for implementing a regulation that would force them to facilitate access to contraceptives and other medical products whose use violates church teaching. Speaking of the regulation Bishop Zubik said, "The mandate would require the Catholic Church as an employer to violate its fundamental beliefs concerning human life and human dignity ..." These cases were consolidated and made it to the Supreme Court as Zubik v. Burwell.

As of May 2018, the diocese was preparing to consolidate its 188 parishes into 57 multi-parish groups. The integration process will formally begin in October 2018 and will last two to five years. The multi-parish groups will consist of two to seven nearby churches. A pastor-led team for each group will serve the needs of its parishes during consolidation. As the parish communities are consolidated, they will be combined into new parishes. The bishop will receive three suggested names for each new parish and detailed recommendations on how parish programs should be individually tailored.

As of 2018, it was the practice of the diocese to hold a twice-yearly "The Light is On For You" campaign to help Catholics who have lost connection to the church to return to the sacrament. The campaign reaches out to Catholics who have not been to confession for years and makes it as convenient as possible for them to return. During the campaign, confession is available at all churches for extended hours.

In July 2021, Pope Francis issued the motu proprio Traditionis custodes, increasing restrictions on the celebration of the Tridentine Mass. The same day of the new regulation's release, the Diocese of Pittsburgh became one of the first dioceses to announce it would continue permitting the daily celebration of the Tridentine Mass at Most Precious Blood of Jesus Parish, located in Pittsburgh. The "personal parish" had been established in July 2019 by Bishop Zubik for the express purpose of daily celebration of the Extraordinary Form of the Roman Rite.

Reorganization – On Mission for the Church ALIVE!
On April 15, 2015, Zubik announced a diocesan-wide initiative called On Mission for the Church ALIVE! On October 15, 2018, the most comprehensive reorganization of the Diocese of Pittsburgh went into effect. This was the beginning of the implementation of a diocesan-wide planning initiative which changed the diocesan parish structure from 188 individual parishes to 57 parish groupings served by clergy teams. Each grouping was assigned to a category, A, B, or C, depending on the urgency that each grouping would be merged into a single parish. The goal of the reorganization was to bring together resources of various parishes in order to bring about "vibrant parishes and effective ministries." The changes were triggered by decreasing Mass attendance in the area and a declining number of priests; by 2025 the Diocese of Pittsburgh was anticipated to have roughly half the number of priests it did in 2018.

Zubik received both acclaim and criticism for On Mission from parishioners across the diocese. Many parishioners felt angry at his decision to close the church building they had attended often since their childhood. Others stated that Zubik's sweeping changes were necessary to keep the diocese alive. Diocesan attendance had fallen sharply since 1990, leading to a significant drop in weekly offertory collections. In his October 15 statement, Zubik acknowledged that "transformation is rarely easy, especially in the heartfelt matters of faith and parish life. I know that this change will require us – the faithful, the clergy, and myself – to let go of some things that are precious and familiar. I also am convinced that our clergy and faithful have what it takes to form deep and lasting relationships within their groupings and to create welcoming communities." All former parishes in the diocese will have been merged by the end of 2023, leaving only 57 parishes in the diocese.

Bishops

Information associated with the short-lived Diocese of Allegheny and its bishops is not included in this list. The Diocese of Allegheny was suppressed and its territory rejoined to the Diocese of Pittsburgh.

Bishops of Pittsburgh
 Michael O'Connor (1843-7/1853), appointed Bishop of Erie
 Michael O'Connor (12/1853-1860)
 Michael Domenec (1860–1876), appointed Bishop of Allegheny
 John Tuigg (1876–1889)
 Richard Phelan (1889–1904; coadjutor bishop 1885–1889)
 Regis Canevin (1904–1921; coadjutor bishop 1903–1904), retired and appointed Archbishop ad personam
 Hugh Boyle (1921–1950)
 John Dearden (1950–1958; coadjutor bishop 1948–1950), appointed Archbishop of Detroit (elevated to Cardinal in 1969)
 John Wright (1959–1969), appointed Prefect of the Congregation for the Clergy (elevated to Cardinal in 1969)
 Vincent Leonard (1969–1983)
 Anthony Bevilacqua (1983–1987), appointed Archbishop of Philadelphia (elevated to Cardinal in 1991)
 Donald Wuerl (1988–2006), appointed Archbishop of Washington (elevated to Cardinal in 2010)
 David Zubik (2007–present)

Current auxiliary bishops
William J. Waltersheid (2011–present)
Mark Eckman (2022–present)

Former auxiliary bishops
Coleman F. Carroll (1953–1958), appointed Bishop of Miami and subsequently elevated to archbishop of the same see
Vincent Martin Leonard (1964–1969), appointed Bishop of Pittsburgh
John Bernard McDowell (1966–1996)
Anthony G. Bosco (1970–1987), appointed Bishop of Greensburg
William J. Winter (1989–2005)
Thomas J. Tobin (1992–1996), appointed Bishop of Youngstown and later Bishop of Providence
David Zubik (1997–2003), appointed Bishop of Green Bay and later Bishop of Pittsburgh
Paul J. Bradley (2004–2009), appointed Bishop of Kalamazoo

Other priests of the diocese who became bishops
Tobias Mullen, appointed Bishop of Erie in 1868
James O'Connor, appointed Vicar Apostolic of Nebraska in 1876 and later Bishop of Omaha
Ralph Leo Hayes, appointed Bishop of Helena in 1933 and later Rector of the Pontifical North American College and Bishop of Davenport
Jerome Daniel Hannan, appointed Bishop of Scranton in 1954
Howard Joseph Carroll, appointed Bishop of Altoona in 1957
William G. Connare, appointed Bishop of Greensburg in 1960
Cyril John Vogel (priest here, 1931–1951), appointed Bishop of Salina in 1965
Norbert Felix Gaughan (priest here, 1945–1951), appointed Auxiliary Bishop of Greensburg in 1975 and later Bishop of Gary
Nicholas C. Dattilo, appointed Bishop of Harrisburg in 1989
Adam J. Maida, appointed Bishop of Green Bay in 1983 and later Archbishop of Detroit (elevated to Cardinal in 1994)
Daniel DiNardo, appointed Coadjutor Bishop (in 1997) and Bishop of Sioux City and later Coadjutor Bishop, Coadjutor Archbishop, and Archbishop of Galveston-Houston (elevated to Cardinal in 2007)
Edward J. Burns, appointed Bishop of Juneau in 2009 and later Bishop of Dallas
Bernard A. Hebda, appointed Bishop of Gaylord in 2009 and later Coadjutor Archbishop of Newark and Archbishop of Saint Paul and Minneapolis
David Bonnar, appointed Bishop of Youngstown in 2021

Churches

Education

The Diocese of Pittsburgh's elementary and secondary schools educate approximately 17,000 students and employ nearly 1,500 teachers, making its school system the fourth largest in Pennsylvania. As of March 2018, the Catholic school system in the diocese operates 69 elementary, pre-K and special schools. The diocese says that enrollment in its school system has fallen by 50 percent since 2000.

Elementary schools

The diocese is in the process of reorganizing its grade schools. Between 2005 and 2010, sixteen elementary schools were closed, with more mergers and consolidations planned.

In March 2018, the diocese announced the merger of two elementary schools and the closure of one school. Saint Rosalia Academy in Greenfield was closed at the end of the academic year. The closure was endorsed by the Pittsburgh-East Regional Catholic Elementary Schools Advisory Board. North American Martyrs School and the Saint Bernadette School, both K-8 institutions in Monroeville, will merge at the start of the 2018–2019 school year. Bishop Zubik has said the new school would be known as the Divine Mercy Academy.

In January 2020, the Pittsburgh-East Regional Catholic Elementary Schools (PERCES) announced the closure of East Catholic School in Forest Hills and Saint Maria Goretti in Bloomfield. The organization cited significant enrollment declines and growing debt as reasons for the closures. Their programs will be shut down at the end of the 2019–2020 school year. In addition to the closures, PERCES announced that Saint Anne School in Castle Shannon, Saint Bernard School in Mount Lebanon, Our Lady of Grace School in Scott Township, and Saint Thomas More School in Bethel Park will merge to form one unified school program, starting in the 2020–2021 school year. The program will have two preschool through eighth grade sites: one at Saint Thomas More and one at Saint Bernard.

High schools

Diocesan

Bishop Canevin High School, Pittsburgh
Central Catholic High School, Pittsburgh (All boys)
North Catholic High School, Cranberry Township
Oakland Catholic High School, Pittsburgh (All girls)
Serra Catholic High School, McKeesport
Seton-La Salle Catholic High School, Mt. Lebanon

Parochial
St. Joseph High School, Harrison Township

Private or independent
Aquinas Academy, Hampton Township
Nazareth Prep, Emsworth
Our Lady of the Sacred Heart High School, Moon Township

Recently closed
Quigley Catholic High School, Baden
Vincentian Academy, McCandless Township

Higher education

Three Catholic colleges and universities operate within the diocese: Duquesne University, Carlow University, and La Roche College. While affiliated with the Catholic Church, they only receive indirect support from the diocese, such as tuition support for students who previously studied at Catholic grade schools or high schools.

Seminarians studying for the priesthood in the Diocese of Pittsburgh complete pre-theological studies at Saint Paul Seminary in the East Carnegie neighborhood of the city of Pittsburgh.

Charity
Every year the diocese holds the Medallion Ball, a debutante ball, that honors young women who perform at least 100 hours of eligible volunteer work. The proceeds from the event benefit St. Lucy's Auxiliary to the Blind. In 2002, a Joan of Arc Medallion was awarded to a young woman with Down's Syndrome who had volunteered as a teacher's assistant. In 2013, a medallion winner was legally blind and had volunteered with a therapeutic horseback-riding program. It is common for attendees to perform more than 800 hours of volunteer work.

Sexual abuse cases
Anthony Cipolla was ordained in 1972. In 1978, he was charged with sexual abuse of a 9-year-old boy; these charges were dropped by the mother, who said she was pressured to do so by Bishop Vincent Leonard. In 1988 new charges were brought by Tim Bendig who said that Cipolla abused him from around 1981 to 1986; this case was settled in 1993, over Cipolla's objections. Cipolla consistently said that he never abused anyone. In 1988, the diocese, by then under the leadership of Bishop Wuerl, banned Cipolla from ministry and from identifying himself as a priest; Cipolla appealed to the Supreme Tribunal of the Apostolic Signatura, the Vatican's highest court, which ordered Bishop Wuerl to return him to ministry. Bishop Wuerl asked the court to reconsider the case on the grounds that its decision showed a lack of awareness of crucial facts such as a civil lawsuit and Cipolla's 1978 arrest for sexually abusing another boy. The court reversed its ruling in 1995 and upheld Cipolla's ban. Cipolla nonetheless continued to minister to the public forcing the diocese to make several public statements that Cipolla was not in good standing. In 2002, Cipolla was laicized by the pope.

At the time of Wuerl's appointment to Pittsburgh, three priests were on administrative leave for molesting two brothers. Their parents originally asked for the priests to be removed from ministry but pressed criminal and civil charges after reflecting on their moral duty to protect others. Bishop Wuerl's advisors unanimously suggested that he not visit the family. Bishop Wuerl decided that it was his duty to minister to their pain. Wuerl said, "The lawyers could talk to one another, but I wasn't ordained to oversee a legal structure. As their bishop I was responsible for the Church's care of that family, and the only way I could do that was to go see them." Father Zubik accompanied him to this meeting. The diocese settled the civil suit, and two of the priests in question were sentenced to prison. They were never allowed to return to ministry. Charges against the third priest were impossible due to the statute of limitations. This priest was forced to retire and forbidden to say mass for anyone by nuns in the convent he was assigned to live in. After seeing the damage inflicted upon their lives and faith, Wuerl implemented a "zero tolerance" policy against sexual abuse. The Diocese of Pittsburgh was among the first Catholic authorities to seriously address sexual abuse. Carefully preparing candidates for the priesthood for a life of celibacy was a key part of Wuerl's reforms.

Bishop Wuerl called a mandatory meeting to inform all priests that sexual contact with a minor was not merely a sin that could be forgiven, but a crime that would result in permanent removal from the ministry and maybe prison. Priests were instructed to report any allegation of sexual abuse committed by a priest or church employee to the chancery. The diocese created the Diocesan Review Board in 1989 to offer evaluations and recommendations to the bishop on the handling of all sexual abuse cases.

It is the policy of the Diocese of Pittsburgh to refer all allegations of child sexual abuse to law enforcement regardless of their credibility. Credible allegations of sexual abuse result in immediate removal from ministry. By direction of Bishop Wuerl, the diocese has had an internal policy on sexual misconduct since 1989. This policy was formalized in 1993, updated in 2002, and updated again in 2003.

Bishop Zubik handed off the case of Rev. David Dzermejko to the Vatican after a diocese review board found that allegations of child sexual abuse against Dzermejko were credible. Dzermejko was removed as pastor of Mary, Mother of the Church in Charleroi in June 2009 after a couple informed the diocese that he had sexually abused their son. Another man came forward to say that Dzermejko had abused him as a child. Dzermejko was removed within 48 hours of the diocese receiving the first allegation.

Grand jury investigation

In early 2016, a grand jury investigation, led by Pennsylvania Attorney General Josh Shapiro, began an inquiry into sexual abuse by Catholic clergy in six Pennsylvania dioceses: Pittsburgh, Allentown, Scranton, Harrisburg, Greensburg, and Erie. The Diocese of Altoona-Johnstown and the Archdiocese of Philadelphia were not included, as they had been the subjects of earlier investigations. Numerous appeals to the state supreme court raised constitutional issues such as due process, fairness, deprivation of the right to personal reputation protected by the state constitution, and the inability of many named members of the Catholic clergy to defend themselves against accusations presented in the reports.

On July 27, 2018, the Pennsylvania Supreme Court ordered that a redacted copy of the grand jury report be released to the public; this release is anticipated to occur in early August 2018.

On August 5, 2018, Pittsburgh Bishop David Zubik sent letters confirming the Diocese of Pittsburgh would cooperate with the Pennsylvania Supreme Court order and release the list of clergy accused of sex abuse when the grand jury report is made public. The letters were read during mass across the six-county diocese. In his letter, Bishop Zubik noted that the diocese implemented policies to deal with sexual abuse 30 years ago. Clergy, church employees, and volunteers are all required to go through sexual abuse training programs and criminal background checks. Zubik also noted that 90 percent of all the allegations in the report related to the diocese of Pittsburgh occurred before 1990. The grand jury report was released on August 14. A total of 99 priests listed in the grand jury report served in the Diocese of Pittsburgh.

The report also stated that some priests in the Diocese of Pittsburgh ran a child porn ring in the 1970s and 1980s and also "used whips, violence and sadism in raping their victims." The children who were sexually molested and had their pictures taken for the child porn ring were given gold crosses so they would be recognized by other abusive priests who sought to use them.

The Diocese of Pittsburgh has steadily improved the quality of screening and training for future priests to ensure that only those men capable of leading a healthy celibate lifestyle are ordained, as well as posting on its website the names of 83 priests in abuse claims.

Lawsuits

In January 2020, a lawsuit against the Diocese of Pittsburgh which was filed by sex abuse survivors, as well as their parents, in September 2018 was allowed to move forward. In February 2020, it was reported that the lawsuit didn't involve requests for monetary awards, but rather greater disclosure of sex abuse records. On April 15, 2020, a man filed a lawsuit against the Diocese of Pittsburgh for allegedly shielding priests who sexually abused him as a boy. On August 7, 2020, a new lawsuit was filed against the Diocese of Pittsburgh from a man alleging that Father Leo Burchianti attacked and raped him twice when he was an altar boy. Burchianti, who died in 2013, is also accused of having inappropriate sexual relationships with at least eight boys and was previously mentioned in the state grand report. Former Pittsburgh Bishop Cardinal Donald Wuerl and current bishop David Zubik have been named as defendants in numerous lawsuits as well.

On August 13, 2020, 25 new sex abuse lawsuits were filed against the Diocese of Pittsburgh. On August 14, 2020, it was revealed that the Diocese of Pittsburgh, along with Archdiocese of Philadelphia, Diocese of Allentown and Diocese of Scranton, was enduring the bulk of 150 new lawsuits filed against all eight Pennsylvania Catholic dioceses. On November 20, 2020, the Pennsylvania Supreme Court denied a petition filed by the Diocese of Pittsburgh to grant a stay which would've delayed three ongoing lawsuits against the Diocese.

See also

Catholic Church in the United States
Ecclesiastical Province of Philadelphia
Global organisation of the Catholic Church
List of Catholic archdioceses (by country and continent)
List of Catholic dioceses (alphabetical) (including archdioceses)
List of Catholic dioceses (structured view) (including archdioceses)
List of the Catholic dioceses of the United States

References

Sources

External links
Catholic Diocese of Pittsburgh Official Site

 
Christianity in Pittsburgh
Religious organizations established in 1843
Pittsburgh
Pittsburgh
1843 establishments in Pennsylvania